The Hot Fuss Tour was the first headlining concert tour by American rock band The Killers. It took place between 2003 and 2005 to support the band's first studio album, Hot Fuss, which was released in June 2004. The tour was enduring with the band playing well over 300 shows in a two-year period.

Synopsis
In late 2003, shortly after being signed by UK independent record label Lizard King and a successful string of performances in London, The Killers announced that they would be touring the UK supporting British Sea Power. During the first half of 2004 they continued playing support slots; opening for Stellastarr on both their UK and US tours and Morrissey on two dates in the US. They also made appearances at South by Southwest & Coachella Festival.

The band began their first ever headline tour in Portsmouth, England on May 23, 2004; Initially the band were headlining small venues which held no more than 1,000 people, by the end of the tour they were regularly selling out venues with capacities of over 5,000. 
The band supported by Kaiser Chiefs, Bloc Party & The Futureheads headlined the NME Awards Tour in early 2005 and also supported U2 on three stadium dates of their Vertigo Tour.
The Killers were joined by British Sea Power for the final leg in North America; bringing the tour full circle, the final show took place in Vancouver, British Columbia, Canada on October 13, 2005. In total they played 305 shows spanning four continents and eighteen different countries.

Support acts during the tour included Louis XIV, Surferosa, The Departure, Ambulance LTD, Blood Arm, The Zutons & Tegan & Sara.

Stage setup
Frontman and keyboardist Brandon Flowers emblazoned his keyboard stand with rhinestones after learning that David Bowie was coming to one of the band's shows at Irving Plaza in New York City, this started a tradition of Flowers' keyboard stands being decorated differently for each tour.

Festivals
The Killers played a number of well received festival sets in the summer of 2004, among these was a performance in the New Bands Tent at Glastonbury Festival. The following year the band were offered the chance by Michael Eavis to headline the Sunday night of Glastonbury after original headliner Kylie Minogue was diagnosed with breast cancer. They declined the offer however, stating that they did not feel they had earned the right to headline the festival yet and instead went on to play in their scheduled sub-headline slot on the Friday night. Despite almost losing guitarist Dave Keuning whilst travelling there (after the band 'accidentally' left him at Fleet services.) the performance was praised by many.

Live 8
On July 2, 2005, The Killers performed on the London stage of the Live 8 concert, performing "All These Things That I've Done". The band (all dressed in white) were joined by a gospel choir. Later that day Robbie Williams incorporated the song's refrain "I've got soul but I'm not a soldier" into his own performance.

Personnel
 Brandon Flowers – lead vocals, keyboards
 Dave Keuning – guitar, background vocals
 Mark Stoermer – bass, background vocals
 Ronnie Vannucci Jr. – drums, percussion, background vocals, keyboards (on "Everything Will Be Alright")

Set list

Sample setlists

Notes
1   "Where is She (Soft Surrender)" was a new song performed by the band, as of 2021 a studio version has yet to be released.
2  "On Top" with Pink Floyd's "Time" segued on to the end of it.
3  "All The Pretty Faces" was a new song performed by the band, it went on to be released as a b-side to "When You Were Young" and also appeared on 2007's compilation album Sawdust and Guitar Hero 5.

Tour dates

TV

Notable television performances

References

2004 concert tours
2005 concert tours
The Killers concert tours